Wheeler Pond is a small lake north-northeast of Old Forge in Herkimer County, New York. It drains south via an unnamed creek which flows into the North Branch Moose River.

See also
 List of lakes in New York

References 

Lakes of New York (state)
Lakes of Herkimer County, New York